Charles Henry Pabor (September 24, 1846 – April 23, 1913), also spelled Charley, nicknamed "The Old Woman in the Red Cap", was an American Major League Baseball left fielder and manager throughout the existence of the National Association, –.

Early life and career
Born in Brooklyn, New York, Pabor played baseball in and around New York City until he joined the Cleveland Forest Citys of the National Association as a left fielder and manager. On May 4, 1871, Pabor managed and played while batting 0-4 in the first game of the season, which is considered the first all professional game ever played, a game between his Forest Citys and the Fort Wayne Kekiongas. He had hit well in 1871, with a .296 batting average, but it dropped to .207 in 1872.

The Cleveland team folded after the season, and Pabor got a fresh start with the Brooklyn Atlantics. He had his best season that year, hitting .360 with 41 runs batted in. The season was a disaster, as the Atlantics only won two of their 44 games. Pabor did not finish the year in Brooklyn, as he signed with the New Haven Elm Citys toward the end of the 1875 season, playing and managing six games and winning only one. Although his record of 13-64 as manager is not prolific, he is credited as starting the careers of both King Kelly and Fred Goldsmith.

Pabor also umpired three games in 1875, all involving Connecticut-based teams.

Post-career
After the end of the 1875 season and the demise of the National Association, Pabor quit baseball altogether, staying in New Haven, Connecticut. He joined the New Haven Police Department, where he enjoyed a long career. Pabor died in New Haven of pneumonia at the age of 66, and he is interred at Mapledale Cemetery.

References

External links

Major League Baseball left fielders
Baseball player-managers
Morrisania Unions players
Cleveland Forest Citys players
Cleveland Forest Citys managers
Brooklyn Atlantics players
Brooklyn Atlantics managers
Philadelphia White Stockings players
New Haven Elm Citys players
New Haven Elm Citys managers
Baseball players from New York (state)
19th-century baseball players
1846 births
1913 deaths
Baseball coaches from New York (state)
Columbus Buckeyes (minor league) players